Marcus Mielke (born 31 January 1975, in Mühlacker) is a German rower.

References 
 
 

1975 births
Living people
Olympic rowers of Germany
Rowers at the 2000 Summer Olympics
World Rowing Championships medalists for Germany
German male rowers
People from Mühlacker
Sportspeople from Karlsruhe (region)
20th-century German people